Miguel Ángel López-Cedrón Freije (born 3 June 1978), known simply as Miguel, is a Spanish retired footballer who played as a centre forward.

Playing career
Born in Oviedo, Asturias, Miguel had his career mainly associated with Sporting de Gijón, being however mainly registered with the reserves during his eight-year tenure. He made his La Liga debut with the first team on 26 April 1998 by coming on as a 57th-minute substitute in a 0–4 away loss against UD Salamanca, and amassed Segunda División totals of 213 matches and 40 goals over ten seasons, representing in the competition Sporting, CD Leganés, SD Eibar, CD Numancia – for which he also appeared in the top flight, in 2004–05– and Elche CF.

Miguel's last two years were spent in Tercera División, with CD Tuilla and CD Llanes.

Post-retirement
After retiring, Miguel joined amateurs UD Llanera as director of football. On 26 June 2019, he was named president of the club.

References

External links

1978 births
Living people
Footballers from Oviedo
Spanish footballers
Association football forwards
La Liga players
Segunda División players
Segunda División B players
Tercera División players
Sporting de Gijón B players
Sporting de Gijón players
CD Leganés players
SD Eibar footballers
CD Numancia players
Elche CF players
Real Oviedo players
Real Avilés CF footballers